Gillian McCutcheon (born April 1939) is a British-based actress who has appeared in many programmes over the years. She has played three parts in the ITV Soap opera The Bill, alone. 
Her first role was The Avengers, in 1961. She also played the unseen therapist in the 1990s series This Life. Other credits include The Brothers, Dixon of Dock Green, Blake's 7, Thriller, A Horseman Riding By, Emmerdale, London's Burning and Holby City.

She is a senior member of London Arts Discovery.

Personal life
For a number of years she was in a relationship with the actor Roger Brierley and they had one son, Oliver Brierley, together. The couple split up in 1996.

External links

1939 births
English television actresses
Living people